Ito Niizuma (5 August 1890 – 15 July 1963) was a Japanese politician. She was one of the first group of women elected to the House of Representatives in 1946.

Biography
Niizuma was born in Yokohama in 1890. She attended Yokohama English Commercial School, graduating in 1911. She then moved to San Francisco in the United States to study at a business college. She married journalist Kaoru Niizuma and joined a political study group led by Mosaburō Suzuki. During World War II she relocated to Hokkaido, where she worked for the Hokkaido Nichiyohin Katsuyo Kyokai in Sapporo. She also ran a typing school for girls and was part of the editorial committee of Katei Shinbun.

After the war, Niizuma contested the Hokkaido 1st district in the 1946 general elections as a Japan Socialist Party candidate, and was elected to the House of Representatives. During her time in parliament she called for the introduction of paternity leave, and was one of the speakers at the first public debate on sex education. She lost her seat in the 1947 elections and subsequently worked for the Ministry of Labour, in which she was the first head of the Boys and Women Division. She also became chair of the Women's Green Cross. She died in 1963.

References

1890 births
People from Yokohama
20th-century Japanese women politicians
20th-century Japanese politicians
Members of the House of Representatives (Japan)
Social Democratic Party (Japan) politicians
Japanese civil servants
1963 deaths